Gated tomography may refer to:
Gated SPECT
Gated X-ray CT, see X-ray computed tomography#Cardiac